Tom Porras (born March 28, 1958) is an American former gridiron football player.  He played as a quarterback in the Canadian Football League (CFL) from 1985 to 1994 for four teams. Previously, he played in the United States Football League (USFL) in their three seasons of existence. Later he played in the Arena Football League.

Porras played college football at the University of Washington in Seattle under head coach Don James, transferring in 1978 from Ventura College in southern California.

From 2003 to 2007, Porras was a substitute teacher and assistant football and track coach at Saguaro High School in Scottsdale, Arizona. On April 26, 2007, he was arrested and placed on administrative leave due to suspicion of sex abuse and public sexual indecency with a female student. The case was dismissed on February 27, 2008 after his confession was thrown out due to a Miranda rights violation.

References

External links
 CFL stats
 Sports Reference: college football statistics

1958 births
Living people
American football quarterbacks
American players of Canadian football
Canadian football quarterbacks
Chicago Blitz players
Arizona Wranglers players
Albany Firebirds players
Boston/New Orleans/Portland Breakers players
Calgary Stampeders players
Charlotte Rage players
Hamilton Tiger-Cats players
Las Vegas Sting players
Toronto Argonauts players
Washington Huskies football players
Winnipeg Blue Bombers players
High school football coaches in Arizona
Sportspeople from Oxnard, California
Players of American football from California
Sportspeople from Ventura County, California